The Arthur-J-LeBlanc Arena (French: Centre Arthur-J-Leblanc) is one of two arenas in Dieppe, New Brunswick.

The arena has two surfaces, one of which meets Olympic size requirements  It is located at 432 Melanson Road, Dieppe, New Brunswick. It was home to the Dieppe Commandos prior to the club's relocation to Edmundston in 2017.

The arena is named after Arthur J . Leblanc.

References

Sports venues in New Brunswick
Sport in Dieppe, New Brunswick